Danylo Olehovych Holub (born 3 July 2003) is a Ukrainian professional footballer who plays as a centre-forward for Ukrainian Premier League club Mynai.

References

External links
 
 

2003 births
Living people
People from Vuhledar
Ukrainian footballers
Association football forwards
FC Mariupol players
FC Inhulets Petrove players
FC Kolos Kovalivka players
FC Mynai players
Ukrainian Premier League players